Daviesia leptophylla, commonly known as narrow-leaf bitter-pea, is a species of flowering plant in the family Fabaceae and is endemic to south-eastern continental Australia. It is a broom-like, multi-stemmed shrub with dull, yellowish-green, linear phyllodes and  bright yellow flowers with maroon markings.

Description

Taxonomy
Daviesia leptophylla was first formally described in 1832 by George Don in his book A General History of Dichlamydeous Plants from an unpublished manuscript by Allan Cunningham. The specific epithet (leptophylla) means "slender-leaved".

Distribution and habitat

References

leptophylla
Flora of New South Wales
Flora of South Australia
Flora of Victoria (Australia)
Flora of the Australian Capital Territory
Plants described in 1832
Taxa named by George Don